The 2021 European Athletics Team Championships was held in four cities, on 29–30 May (Super League) and on 19–20 June 2021. For the very first time, the ETC was not held on the same weekend for all leagues. At the European Athletics Team Championships medals are not awarded in individual events.

Grouping and host cities

It had been decided in 2018 that, starting in 2021, a new system would be introduced for grouping teams in the ETC. This would aim to have 8 teams in the Super League (plus the host country if it had not already qualified), 12 teams in the First and Second Leagues, and all the remaining teams in the Third League.
The city of Minsk, Belarus, initially designated as the Super League venue, was replaced by Chorzów in November 2020 due to the political situation in Belarus.

Super League

The 2021 Super League will consist of only 8 teams, instead of the previously 12 in all previous editions.

As Ukraine withdrew on 24 May because of the COVID-19 pandemic, the EAA ruled that they will be relegated in 2023.

The event will be attended by 7,600 spectators. The entry is free.

Participating countries

 
 
 
 
 
  (promoted)
 
  (withdrew)

2 relegations in 2023: Portugal and Ukraine.

Final entries
406 athletes (206 men, 200 women) from 7 (8 scheduled) countries. 54 athletes from Ukraine (all team) did not enter the Championships. Many potential winners entered, like Marcell Jacobs, Gianmarco Tamberi, Marcin Lewandowski, Piotr Lisek or Jessie Knight, also late withdrew.
final entries

Timetable
Time table

Men's events

Women's events

Final standings

Before the last event on Sunday, the Men's 4x400 m relay, three teams could still win the Championship: Poland with 176.5 points, Great Britain with 174 points and Italy with 172 points.

The Italian team took an easy  lead of the race after the first two legs, with Alessandro Sibilio passing the baton to Edoardo Scotti at third leg, with Great Britain just beside him. But the third leg British runner was then unable to give his baton to his teammate Rabah Yousif, and the Polish team finished strongly in the last leg to go from 5th to 3rd. As a result, Poland obtained enough points to win over Italy, which set the EL time, winning the last race, as during 2019 European Team Championships with the same EL result.

Score table

Broken records

 Men's 5000m CR Yemaneberhan Crippa (ITA) 13:17.23	on 29 May 2021
 Men's Javelin Throw WL CR Johannes Vetter (GER) 96.29 m on 29 May 2021
 Men's Hammer Throw WL CR Paweł Fajdek (POL) 82.98 m on 30 May 2021
 Men's Triple Jump EL Max Heß (GER) 17.13 m on 30 May 2021
 Men's 4 x 400m Relay EL Italy Team with Davide Re, Alessandro Sibilio, Edoardo Scotti and Vladimir Aceti 3:02.64 on 30 May 2021
 Women's Javelin Throw CR Christin Hussong (GER) 69.19 m on 30 May 2021
 Women's 4 x 400m Relay EL	Poland Team with Małgorzata Hołub-Kowalik, Kornelia Lesiewicz, Justyna Święty-Ersetic and Natalia Kaczmarek 3:26.37 on 30 May 2021.

Medal table
At the European Athletics Team Championships medals are only awarded to teams, but with gold, silver and bronze conventionally refers to the top three finishes.

First League

Participating countries
The two first teams of the First League 2021 shall be promoted to the Super League 2023. The lowest three teams of the First League 2021 (including Ireland as a penalty for its withdrawal) shall be relegated to the Second League 2023.

 
 
  (–)
  (+)
  (–)
  (–)
  (withdrew)
  
 
  
  (–)
  (–)

Men's events

Women's events

Final standings

NOTES:
 Ireland, who withdrew citing Covid reasons, was relegated to the Second League 2023.
 As the city of Minsk, Belarus, had initially been chosen to host the 2021 Super League by European Athletics, their team should have been automatically promoted to that division following this competition.

Broken records

Men's Long Jump, CR, Miltiadis Tentoglou, 8,38 m, 19 June 2021
Men's 4 x 400m Relay, Final A, EL and NR,  (Jan Tesař, Vít Müller, Michal Desenský, Patrik Šorm) 3:02.42, 20 Jun 2021
Women's 400m, Final A, EL and CR, Femke Bol, 50.37, 19 Jun 2021
Women's 100m Hurdles, Final A, CR, Elvira Herman, 12.62, 20 Jun 2021
Women's Triple Jump, EL and NR, Senni Salminen, 14.63 m, 19 Jun 2021

Second League

Participating countries

The three first classified teams of the Second League 2021 shall be promoted to the First League 2023. The lowest three teams of the Second League 2021, Russia, Austria and Israel, did not participate and were automatically relegated to Third League 2023.

Austria and Israel withdrew due to the COVID-19 pandemic, while Russia were disqualified as the team was still banned from competing internationally at the time entries closed.

 DNS

 (-)
 (+)
 DNS

 (-)
 * (-) DSQ
(-)

NOTES: 
 As Russia were serving their continuing suspension by the IAAF for gross and systematic doping violations, they were disqualified, and is thus relegated to Second League.

Men's events

Women's events

Score table

Final standings

Third League
3 promotion spots for 2023.

Participating countries

  AASSE
 
 
  
  
  
  (-)
  (-)
  (-)
 
  (-)

Men's events

Women's events

Score table

Final standings

Source:.

References

Statistics Handbook
Final results
Results book Bydgoszcz 2019.
First League Results Book
Third League Results Book

External links
Official EAA Site
Official Site
Official site First League
Official site Third League 

 
European Athletics Team Championships
Team
European
International athletics competitions hosted by Bulgaria
International athletics competitions hosted by Cyprus
International athletics competitions hosted by Poland
International athletics competitions hosted by Romania
European Team Championships
European Team Championships